Alexandra Theatre may refer to:

 Alexandra Theatre (Birmingham), a theatre in Birmingham, England, now the New Alexandra Theatre
 Alexandra Theatre (London), a theatre in the Stoke Newington district of London
 Alexandra Theatre, Bognor Regis, a theatre in the British town of Bognor Regis
Alexandra Theatre, Melbourne, a former name for Her Majesty's Theatre